Martyropolis is a historical episcopal see of early Christianity, in what was the Roman province of Mesopotamia, now located in modern Turkey. It is now a titular see of the Roman Catholic Church.

Historical diocese 
The diocese was centered on what is now Silvan, Diyarbakır in the province of Mesopotamia.

Known bishops 
 Zennebus,
 Maruthas fl. 383-420.

Titular sees

Latin archepiscopal titular see 
The diocese was nominally restored when a Latin (Roman Rite) titular bishopric was established under the name Martiria, of the lowest (episcopal) rank. Around 1830 it was renamed Martyropolis

In 1932, it was promoted to titular archdiocese, and had three notable incumbents:
Titular archbishops of Martyropolis
 (Chaldean) Yousef VII Ghanima † (29 April 1946 Appointed – 21 June 1948 Confirmed, Patriarch of Babylon of the Chaldeans (Iraq) ([1947.09.17] 1948.06.21 – 1958.07.08)
 Basil Ladyka, * O.S.B.M. † (21 June 1948 Appointed – 1 Sep 1956 Died)
 João Resende (Rezende) Costa, S.D.B. † (19 July 1957 Appointed – 15 Nov 1967 Succeeded, Archbishop of Belo Horizonte, Minas Gerais)
It has been vacant since 1967.

Syrian Catholic episcopal titular see 
A titular see of the Syrian Catholic (Antiochian Rite) church was also established, but suppressed in 1929, without a single recorded incumbent.

References

Sources and external links 
 GigaCatholic Latin titular see
 GigaCatholic Syrian Catholic titular see

Catholic titular sees in Asia
Eastern Catholic titular sees
Roman Catholic dioceses in Turkey
Syriac Catholic dioceses
Şanlıurfa Province
Martyropolis